Chubin may refer to:

Places
Chubin, Chaharmahal and Bakhtiari, a village in Iran
Chubin, Qazvin, a village in Iran
Chubin, Razavi Khorasan, a village in Iran
Chubin Dar, a village in Iran

Other uses
Chubin (surname)